The given name Lisa can be a short form of Elisabeth, Melissa or Elizabeth.  In the United Kingdom, the name Lisa began to gain popularity during the 1960s, by 1974 it was the fifth most popular female name there, and a decade later it was the 14th most popular female name there. However, by 1996 it had fallen out of the top 100.  Similarly, in the US it was the most popular female name for most of the 1960s and in the top 10 through most of the 1970s before falling.

Notable people with the given name Lisa

 Lisa (French musician) (born 1997, Lisa Gautier, French singer performing as "Lisa")
 Lisa (Japanese musician, born 1974) stylized "LISA", Elizabeth Sakura Narita, member of the Japanese hip-hop group m-flo
 Lisa Allen (born 1981), British chef
 Lisa Ambalavanar, English actress
 Anna Lisa Andersson (1873–1958), Swedish reporter
 Lalisa Manobal (born 1997) Thai singer and rapper, member of K-pop group Blackpink
 Lisa Ann (born 1972), American radio host
 Lisa Arce (born 1969), beach volleyball player
 Lisa Aukland (born 1958), American bodybuilder and powerlifter
 Lisa Aziz (born 1962), British television presenter
 Lisa Banes (1955–2021), American actress
 Lisa Barlow (born 1974), American television personality and businesswoman
 Lisa Barros D'Sa, British director and actress
 Lisa Bodnar, American nutritional and perinatal epidemiologist
 Lisa Bonet (born 1967), American actress
 Maja-Lisa Borgman (1750–1791), Swedish coffee house owner
 Lisa Bowman (born 1988), Irish netball player
 Lisa Brennan-Jobs (born 1978), American author and daughter of Steve Jobs
 Lisa Coleman (musician), American musician and composer, member of The Revolution
 Lisa Cross (born 1978), British bodybuilder
 Lisa Curry-Kenny (born 1962), Australian swimmer
 Lisa D'Amato (born 1980), model and contestant in America's Next Top Model 
 Lisa Dahlkvist (born 1987), Swedish football player
 Lisa Ekdahl (born 1971), Swedish singer
 Lisa Erlandsdotter (1774–1854), Swedish artist
 Lisa Evans (born 1992), Scottish footballer
 Lisa Anne Fletcher (1844–1905), American poet and correspondent
 Lisa Foiles (born 1986), American actress
 Lisa Ann French (1964–1973), American murder victim
 Lisa Fuillerat (died 2017), American murder victim
 Lisa Germano (born 1958), American singer/songwriter
 Lisa Gherardini (1479–1542), namesake and possible model for the Mona Lisa
 Lisa Gleave (born 1976), Australian actress and model
 Lisa Hannigan (born 1981), Irish singer-songwriter
 Lisa M. Hansen, American producer, actress, director, and writer
 Lisa Harriton, American singer-songwriter, keyboardist and sound designer
 Lisa Heller, American singer, songwriter and philanthropist
 Lisa Hilton (born 1974), British author
 Lisa Höpink (born 1998), German swimmer
 Lisa Linn Kanae, Hawaiian professor
 Lisa Kehler (born 1967), English race walker
 Lisa Kelly (trucker) (born 1980), American trucker
 Lisa Kelly (born 1977), Irish classical singer
 Lisa Kudrow (born 1963), American actress
 Lisa Lambe (born 1983), Irish singer and performer
 Lisa Lampanelli (born 1961), American comedian
 Lisa Lavie (born 1983), Canadian singer-songwriter
 Lisa Leslie (born 1972, American basketball player
 Lisa Ling (born 1973), American journalist
 Lisa Loeb (born 1968), pop singer/songwriter
 Lisa Lopes (1971–2002), American musician, member of TLC
 Lisa Loring (1958–2023), American actress
 Lisa Lucas (born 1961), American actress and journalist
 Lisa Mainiero (born 1957), American writer and management professor
 Lisa Manoban (born 1997), Thai singer, dancer and member of K-pop group BLACKPINK
 Lisa Martin (disambiguation), multiple people
 Lisa Marx (born 1981), American guitarist and member of Kittie
 Lisa McPherson (1959–1995), Scientologist
 Lisa McCune (born 1971), Australian actress
 Lisa Middelhauve (born 1980), German singer
 Lisa Mirabello, American medical geneticist
 Lisa Mitchell (born 1990), Australian musician
 Ivory (wrestler) née Lisa Moretti (born 1961), American wrestler
Lisa Nandy (born 1979), British politician and Labour MP for Wigan in House of Commons
 Lisa Niemi (born 1956), American actress, widow of Patrick Swayze
 Lisa Nowak (born 1963), American astronaut; arrested for attempted kidnap and attempted murder
 Lisa Origliasso (born 1984), Australian musician, member of The Veronicas
 Lisa Osofsky, British/American lawyer
 Lisa Parks (born 1967), American media scholar
 Lisa Powell (born 1970), Australian field hockey player
 Lisa Marie Presley (1968–2023), American singer, daughter of Elvis Presley
 Lisa Ray (born 1972), Canadian actress
 Lisa Raymond (born 1973), American tennis player
 Lisa Rinna (born 1963), American actress
 Lisa Robin Kelly (1970–2013), American actress
 Lisa Rubin (born 1977), Canadian theatre director
 Lisa Scott-Lee (born 1975), British singer, member of Steps
 Lisa Selesner, known as Lisa S. (born 1978), American international model, actress and veejay
 Lisa Marie (actress) née Lisa Marie Smith (born 1968), American model and actress
 Lisa Stansfield (born 1966), British singer
 Lisa Steier (1888–1928), Swedish ballerina
 Lisa Stokke (born 1975), Norwegian actress and singer
 Lisa Su (born 1969), Taiwanese-American executive, CEO of Advanced Micro Devices
 Lisa Tucker (singer) (born 1989), American singer
 Lisa Vanderpump (born 1960), American television personality and businesswoman
 Lisa Marie Varon (born 1971), American bodybuilder, fitness competitor, and wrestler
 Lisa Velez (born 1966), singer, better known as Lisa Lisa
 Lisa Wallace, Big Brother 2009 contestant
 Lisa Walton (born 1975), New Zealand field hockey player 
 Lisa Welander (1909–2001), Swedish neurologist
 Lisa Wilcox (born 1964), American actress
 Lisa Willner, American politician
 Lisa Wooding (born 1979), English field hockey player
 Lisa Mantler (born 2002), German social media person, (from Lisa and Lena)
 List of names starting with Lisa

Fictional characters

 Lisa, a character in the 1981 American slasher movie The Prowler
 Lisa, a character in the television show Home Improvement
 Lisa, a character in the 2005 American science fiction adventure Zathura: A Space Adventure
 Lisa, a character in the movie 2009 American comedy film The Hangover
 Lisa Asparagus, a character and Junior's mom in the video series VeggieTales
 Lisa Burnett, founder and President of SPS
 Lisa (1990 film), a 1990 film starring Cheryl Ladd, featuring a character named Lisa
 Lisa (2001 film), a 2001 film starring Marion Cotillard, featuring a character named Lisa
 Lisa, mythical girlfriend of the Internet Oracle
 Lisa, portrayed by Juliette Danielle, the female lead in Tommy Wiseau's film The Room
 Lisa in the film Weird Science
 Lisa, one of the protagonists of the book series featuring Gaspard and Lisa
 Lisa Armstrong, the titular character of the video game Lisa: The Painful
 Lisa Braeden, a character in the television series Supernatural
 Lisa Cuddy, a character in House M.D.
 Lisa Dingle, a character in the popular British soap opera Emmerdale
 Lisa Douglas, the socialite wife of Oliver Wendell Douglas in the 1960s sitcom Green Acres
 Lisa Fortier, a fictional voodoo priestess portrayed by Pam Grier in the blaxploitation film Scream Blacula Scream (1973)
 Lisa Carol Fremont, a character played by Grace Kelly in Alfred Hitchcock's film Rear Window (1954)
 Lisa Hayes, a character in the American television sitcom Diff'rent Strokes
 Lisa Hayes, a main character in the Robotech television series
 Lisa Heffenbacker, a character from the TV series  The Electric Company
 Lisa Garland, a character in the video game franchise Silent Hill
 Lisa Grimaldi, a character in the soap opera As the World Turns
 Lisa Haglund, a character of the Bert Diaries novels series
 Lisa Hamilton, a character in the Dead or Alive video game series
 Lisa Kramer, a character in the 2004 American romantic comedy movie Along Came Polly
 Lisa Landry, a character from the American sitcom Sister, Sister
 Lisa Loud from The Loud House
 Lisa McDowell, a character in the 1988 American romantic comedy film Coming to America
 Lisa Minci, a playable Electro character in the video game Genshin Impact
 Lisa Nelson, the main character in the 1975 novel The Girl Who Owned a City
 Lisa Niles, a character in the American soap opera General Hospital
 Lisa Rowe, a charismatic sociopath portrayed by Angelina Jolie in the film Girl, Interrupted
 Lisa Simpson, a character in the TV Show The Simpsons; she is the daughter of Homer and Marge Simpson
 Lisa Snart, a DC Comics supervillainess known as Golden Glider
  Lisa Yadomaru, a vizard and former lieutenant, later captain in manga Bleach
 Lisa Tepes, wife of Count Dracula and mother of Alucard in both the video game and animated series Castlevania
 Lisa Trevor, a character in the horror survival series games "Resident Evil"
 Lisa Turtle, a character in the teen show Saved by the Bell
 Lisa Watmough, a character in Robert Swindells's book Room 13 
 Lisa Wilbourn, a character in the novel Worm (web serial)
 Princess Lisa, a character in Tolstoy's book War and Peace

See also
 
 Leeza Gibbons, American talk show host
 Liisa (given name)
 Lisa (disambiguation)
 Lisa (surname)
 Lyssa Chapman, American bounty hunter
 Lessa (surname)

References